Michel Cury Neto (born 24 July 1981) is a Brazilian football midfielder who currently plays for Araxá.

He started his career in Cruzeiro Esporte Clube, where he played together with Maicon and Luisão. He played one season for FC Spartak Trnava in the Slovak Super Liga.

References

External links

1981 births
Living people
People from Divinópolis
Brazilian footballers
Brazilian expatriate footballers
Cruzeiro Esporte Clube players
Tupi Football Club players
Associação Académica de Coimbra – O.A.F. players
Expatriate footballers in Portugal
Brazilian expatriate sportspeople in Portugal
FC Spartak Trnava players
Expatriate footballers in Slovakia
Brazilian expatriate sportspeople in Slovakia
Slovak Super Liga players
Association football midfielders
Sportspeople from Minas Gerais